Pierre Delanoë (16 December 1918 – 27 December 2006), born Pierre Charles Marcel Napoléon Leroyer in Paris, France, was a French lyricist who wrote thousands of songs for dozens of singers, including Dalida, Edith Piaf, Charles Aznavour, Petula Clark, Johnny Hallyday, Joe Dassin, Michel Sardou and Mireille Mathieu. Delanoë was his grandmother's maiden name.

Career
Following obtaining a law degree, Delanoë began a career as a tax collector, and later a tax inspector. After World War II, he met Gilbert Bécaud and began working as a lyricist. For a period, he even performed alongside Bécaud in clubs. They penned some of France's most beloved songs, including "Et maintenant", translated into English as "What Now My Love", which was covered by artists including Agnetha Fältskog, Elvis Presley, Frank Sinatra, Barbra Streisand, the Supremes, Sonny & Cher, Herb Alpert & the Tijuana Brass and the Temptations. "Je t'appartiens" ("Let It Be Me") was covered by the Everly Brothers, Tom Jones, Bob Dylan, Willie Nelson, Nina Simone and Nofx. "Crois-moi ça durera" was covered as "You'll See" by Nat King Cole.

In addition to Bécaud, Delanoë wrote for Édith Piaf ("La Goualante du pauvre Jean"), Tino Rossi, Hugues Aufray, Michel Fugain ("Je n'aurai pas le temps", "Une belle histoire"), Nicoletta, Nana Mouskouri, Michel Polnareff, Gérard Lenorman ("La Ballade des gens heureux"), Joe Dassin ("L'Été indien", "Les Champs-Élysées", "Et si tu n'existais pas"), Nicole Rieu ("Et bonjour à toi l'artiste") and Michel Sardou ("Les Vieux Mariés", "Le France"). He wrote a passionate song about Joan of Arc in "La demoiselle d'Orléans" for Mireille Mathieu. The final lyric: "When I think of all I have given France... and she has forgotten me" was truly how the singer felt as she was made a caricature by Communists.

The song "Dors, mon amour", performed by André Claveau, for which Delanoë only wrote the music, and went on to win the Eurovision Song Contest 1958.

In 1955, Delanoë helped to launch Europe 1 as Director of Programs, the first French radio station to program popular music in a modern way. 

He served as President of SACEM in 1984 and 1986, then from 1988 to 1990, and 1992 to 1994. He was awarded the Poets Grand Prize in 1997 by the institution.

On 31 March 2004, Delanoë was given France's highest culture award, Commandeur of the Ordre des Arts et des Lettres.

He created some controversy in July 2006 after expressing dislike for rap music, saying that it is "a form of expression for people incapable of making music" and "not music but vociferations, eructations (belching)".

Death
Delanoë died of cardiac arrest in the early morning of 27 December 2006 in Poissy near Paris. He is buried in the Cimetière de Fourqueux, which is just southeast of Poissy. His wife Micheline Leroyer (née Biesel) died on 16 January 2015, aged 97, and is buried beside him. They had three children: Pierre-Denis, Sylvie and Caroline.

Bibliography
 Pierre Delanoë, La vie en chantant, éditions René Julliard, 1980
 Pierre Delanoë, Le surnuméraire, éditions René Julliard, 1982
 Pierre Delanoë, Le 19è trou, éditions Robert Laffont, 1984
 Pierre Delanoë, en collaboration avec A. J. Lafaurie et Philippe Letellier, Golfantasmes, éditions Albin Michel, 1986
 Pierre Delanoë, La retraite aux flambeaux, éditions Robert Laffont, 1986
 Pierre Delanoë, Poésies et chansons, éditions Seghers, 1986
 Pierre Delanoë, Et à part ça qu'est-ce que vous faites ?, éditions Michel Lafon, 1987
 Pierre Delanoë, Comment écrire une chanson, éditions Paul Beuscher, 1987
 Pierre Delanoë, avant-propos de Jean-Marc Natel, Paroles à lire, poèmes à chanter, éditions Le Cherche Midi, 1990
 Pierre Delanoë, entretiens avec Alain-Gilles Minella, La chanson en colère, éditions Mame, 1993
 Pierre Delanoë, illustrations de Barberousse, Les comptines de Titine, éditions Hemma Éditions, 1995
 Pierre Delanoë, illustrations de Barberousse, Les comptines d'Eglantine, éditions Hemma Éditions, 1995
 Pierre Delanoë, préface de Jean-Marc Natel, voix de Charles Aznavour à Jean-Claude Brialy en passant par Renaud, Anthologie de la poésie française de Charles d'Orléans à Charles Trenet, éditions du Layeur, 1997
 Pierre Delanoë, en collaboration avec Alain Poulanges, préface de Gilbert Bécaud, La vie en rose, éditions Plume, 1997
 Pierre Delanoë, illustrations de Barberousse, musique Gérard Calvi, interprètes Jacques Haurogné, Juliette, Fabienne Guyon, Pierre Delanoë, Xavier Lacouture et Catherine Estourelle, La comptine à Titine, éditions Hemma Éditions, 1998
 Pierre Delanoë, préface de Michel Tournier de l'Académie Goncourt, Des paroles qui chantent, éditions Christian Pirot, 1999
 Pierre Delanoë, préface de Gilbert Bécaud, Le témoin était aveugle, éditions Les vents contraires, 2000
 Pierre Delanoë, préface de Jean-Marc Natel, narration de Brigitte Lahaie, musique de Guy Boyer, La poésie dans le boudoir, éditions du Layeur, 2000
 Pierre Delanoë, préface de Jean Orizet, D'humeur et dhumour, éditions Mélis éditions, 2002
 Pierre Delanoë, Tous des putes, éditions Mélis éditions, 2002
 Pierre Delanoë, en collaboration avec Jean Beaulne, Pierre Delanoë…Et maintenant'', éditions City Éditions, 2004

External links
 Official website (in French)

References

1918 births
2006 deaths
Writers from Paris
French songwriters
Male songwriters
Commandeurs of the Ordre des Arts et des Lettres
20th-century French musicians
Eurovision Song Contest winners